Sir Speedy is a printing and marketing services company headquartered in Mission Viejo, California, United States. 
 Founded in 1968, the company has nearly 600 franchises in 13 countries. Sir Speedy is known as the "world's largest printing, copying, and document management franchisor serving small and mid-sized businesses".

Sir Speedy has received numerous awards and industry recognition including: Franchise Times Top 200, Entrepreneur Franchise 500, Quick Printing Top 100, Printing Impressions 400, All Business Allstar 300, Franchise 50 Award, International Franchise Association's Franchise of the Year Award, CEO, Don Lowe, was featured as "Man of the Year" in Quick Printing magazine in 1995, CEO, Don Lowe, was inducted into the Sales & Marketing Executives International Academy of Achievement Hall of Fame in 2004.

References

External links
Sir Speedy official website

Printing companies of the United States
Marketing companies established in 1968
Retail companies established in 1968
Franchises
Companies based in Orange County, California
1968 establishments in California